Edward Staniland (30 October 1874 – 1 September 1917) was an Australian rules footballer who played with Fitzroy in the Victorian Football League (VFL).

Recruited from Fitzroy Juniors in 1895, Staniland played for Fitzroy for three years, the final year being the first year of the Victorian Football League competition. He subsequently returned to Fitzroy Juniors before playing for Williamstown in the Victorian Football Association (VFA) from 1900 to 1903. He played 44 games and kicked 64 goals for Williamstown and was Club leading goalkicker in 1900 (16 goals), 1901 (25 goals) and 1902 (13 goals).

In June 1903 his senior career was ended following a workplace accident and his club raised funds to support him as he was unable to work for some time.

He died at his home in Fitzroy in September 1917.

Sources

External links

1874 births
1917 deaths
Fitzroy Football Club players
Williamstown Football Club players
VFL/AFL players born in England
English players of Australian rules football